The Men's 10 km competition at the 2022 World Aquatics Championships was held on 29 June 2022.

Results
The race was started at 12:00.

References

Men's 10 km
Men's 10 km open water